Avo is a masculine given name and may refer to:
Avo Keel (born 1962), Estonian volleyball player and coach
Avo Kiir (born 1952), Estonian Lutheran clergyman and politician
Avo Paistik (1936−2013), Estonian cartoonist, author, film director, painter and pastor
Avo Sõmer (born 1934), Estonian-American musicologist and composer
Avo Uvezian (born 1926), American jazz pianist and cigar manufacturer
Avo Viiol (born 1958), Estonian embezzler

See also
Aavo

References

Estonian masculine given names